Fictibacillus barbaricus is a bacterium from the genus of Fictibacillus which has been isolated from a wall painting in Austria.

References

External links 

Type strain of Fictibacillus barbaricus at BacDive -  the Bacterial Diversity Metadatabase

Bacillaceae
Bacteria described in 2003